Sheila Frahm (née Sloan; born March 22, 1945) is an American politician who served in the United States Senate as a Republican from Kansas for a brief period in 1996.

Life and career
Frahm was born in Colby, Kansas. She was appointed to the Kansas state Board of Education in 1985 and was re-elected in 1986. In 1988, she was appointed to the position of vice-president. Frahm was a member of the Kansas State Senate from 1989 to 1995. She became the first woman to be given the title of majority leader of the Kansas Senate when she was elected in 1993. Frahm was the 44th Lieutenant Governor of Kansas from 1995 to 1996. While serving as lieutenant governor, Frahm also served as the state's Secretary of Administration.

She was appointed by Governor Bill Graves to the Senate on June 11, 1996 to replace Senate Majority Leader Bob Dole, who resigned from the Senate to devote all of his time to his Presidential campaign. During her time in the Senate, Frahm voted with the Republican party 92.9% of the time. The Senate average was 87.5%. Frahm ran in the special election to succeed him, but she was defeated for the Republican nomination by first-term US Representative Sam Brownback. Brownback went on to win the November 1996 election, and immediately took office.

Other
Frahm is an Honorary Chair of Women for Kansas. She moved back to Colby, Kansas, and became the executive director of the Kansas Association of Community College Trustees. For the 2018 gubernatorial election, Frahm joined many other high-profile Republican current and former legislators and politicians in endorsing the Democratic candidate, and eventual victor, Laura Kelly.

See also
List of female lieutenant governors in the United States
Women in the United States Senate

References

|-

|-

1945 births
Female United States senators
Fort Hays State University alumni
Republican Party Kansas state senators
Lieutenant Governors of Kansas
Living people
People from Colby, Kansas
Republican Party United States senators from Kansas
School board members in Kansas
State cabinet secretaries of Kansas
University of Texas at Austin alumni
Women state legislators in Kansas
Women state constitutional officers of Kansas
20th-century American politicians
20th-century American women politicians
21st-century American women